Caviid betaherpesvirus 2 (CaHV-2) is a species of virus in the genus Quwivirus, in the subfamily Betaherpesvirinae, family Herpesviridae, and order Herpesvirales.

References

External links
 

Betaherpesvirinae